Adrijana Krasniqi (born 4 November 1997), better known as Adrijana, is a Swedish singer, songwriter, and rapper of Macedonian Albanian origin. She is best known for competing in Melodifestivalen 2017.

In 2015, Krasniqi released her first official single "Mammas Opel", and then in October 2016, she signed with record label Universal Music Sweden. Later the same year she got to perform at the hip hop stage Debaser in Stockholm. In 2017, she competed in Melodifestivalen 2017, the Swedish national selection for the Eurovision Song Contest 2017, with the song "Amare", which she wrote together with Martin Tjärnberg. She came in 6th place in the first semi-final on 4 February. On 10 February 2017, "Amare" entered the Swedish Singles Chart at number 62.

Discography

Singles

References

1997 births
Living people
Macedonian emigrants to Sweden
Swedish people of Macedonian descent
Swedish people of Albanian descent
People from Växjö Municipality
21st-century Swedish singers
21st-century Swedish women singers
Melodifestivalen contestants of 2017